Gilman is a city in the southeastern corner of Marshall County, Iowa, United States. The population was 542 at the time of the 2020 census.

History

Gilman got its start in the year 1870, following construction of the Central Railroad of Iowa through the territory. The town is named for Charles Gilman, a railroad contractor. Gilman was incorporated in 1876.

Geography
Gilman is located at  (41.879750, -92.788786).

Demographics

2010 census
At the 2010 census there were 509 people in 233 households, including 142 families, in the city. The racial makup of the city was 99.6% White, 0.2% from other races, and 0.2% from two or more races. Hispanic or Latino of any race were 0.8%.

Of the 233 households 28.8% had children under the age of 18 living with them, 48.1% were married couples living together, 11.6% had a female householder with no husband present, 1.3% had a male householder with no wife present, and 39.1% were non-families. 34.8% of households were one person and 15% were one person aged 65 or older. The average household size was 2.18 and the average family size was 2.83.

The median age was 42.6 years. 23.6% of residents were under the age of 18; 5.3% were between the ages of 18 and 24; 24.2% were from 25 to 44; 30.1% were from 45 to 64; and 16.9% were 65 or older. The gender makeup of the city was 48.7% male and 51.3% female.

2000 census
At the 2000 census there were 600 people in 248 households, including 162 families, in the city. The racial makup of the city was 99.50% White, and 0.50% from two or more races. Hispanic or Latino of any race were 0.33%.

Of the 248 households 32.7% had children under the age of 18 living with them, 53.2% were married couples living together, 10.1% had a female householder with no husband present, and 34.3% were non-families. 29.4% of households were one person and 14.5% were one person aged 65 or older. The average household size was 2.42 and the average family size was 2.98.

27.5% were under the age of 18, 5.3% from 18 to 24, 27.0% from 25 to 44, 23.3% from 45 to 64, and 16.8% were 65 or older. The median age was 39 years. For every 100 females, there were 92.9 males. For every 100 females age 18 and over, there were 82.8 males.

The median household income was $33,523 and the median family income  was $42,500. Males had a median income of $35,000 versus $20,250 for females. The per capita income for the city was $15,070. About 9.9% of families and 12.7% of the population were below the poverty line, including 18.9% of those under age 18 and 8.9% of those age 65 or over.

Education
East Marshall Community School District serves the community. The district was established on July 1, 1992 by the merger of the LDF and SEMCO school districts.

See also

 List of cities in Iowa

References

External links

Cities in Iowa
Cities in Marshall County, Iowa